Eupithecia comes is a moth in the family Geometridae first described by Claude Herbulot in 1986. It is found in Guadeloupe and Saint Kitts.

References

Moths described in 1986
comes
Moths of the Caribbean